Penamacor ( or ) is a municipality in the district of Castelo Branco in Portugal.

The mayor is António Luís Beites Soares. The municipal holiday is Easter Monday.

Parishes 
Administratively, the municipality is divided into 9 civil parishes (freguesias):
 Aldeia do Bispo, Águas e Aldeia de João Pires
 Aranhas
 Benquerença
 Meimão
 Meimoa
 Pedrógão de São Pedro e Bemposta
 Penamacor
 Salvador
 Vale da Senhora da Póvoa

Notable people 
 António Nunes Ribeiro Sanches (1699 in Penamacor – 1783 in Paris) a physician, philosopher and encyclopédiste.
 Francisco Cunha Leal (1888 in Pedrógão – 1970) politician during the Portuguese First Republic; 84th Prime Minister of Portugal, 1921/1922.
 Joaquim Furtado (born 1948 in Penamacor) a journalist, reporter, TV anchor and documentary film director.
 António José Seguro (born 1962 in Penamacor) a Portuguese politician

References

External links
Town Hall official website

Populated places in Castelo Branco District
Municipalities of Castelo Branco District
People from Penamacor